Maria Misra is a Lecturer in Modern History at University of Oxford and a Fellow of Keble College, specialising in the politics, culture, and economics of nineteenth- and twentieth-century imperialism and colonialism.

She has written two books on Indian history: Business, Race and Politics in British India and Vishnu's Crowded Temple, India since the Great Rebellion.  The latter, published by Allen Lane to be timed with India's 60 years of independence, addresses the question of how India's traditions of caste and religious identities are able to coexist with a modern democratic state on its way to becoming a major economic power.

She has presented a television documentary series on eighteenth- and nineteenth-century India which was broadcast in 2001, has written for the New Statesman, The Guardian, The Times and The Financial Times and has contributed to the Saturday Review on Radio 4. She is a columnist for the Times Higher Education Supplement.

Publications
  "Politics and Expatriate Enterprise in India: The Inter-War Years" in Business and Politics in India: A Historical Perspective (ed. D.Tripathi), (New Delhi, 1991)
 Business, Race and Politics in British India c.1860-1960. (Oxford, 1999) 250pp.
 "Gentlemanly Capitalism and the Raj: British Policy in India, c. 1860-1947" in Gentlemanly Capitalism and British Imperialism: The New Debate of Empire (ed. R.E. Dumett), (Basingstoke, 1999) pp 157–174
 "Business Culture and Entrepreneurship in British India, 1860-1950", Modern Asian Studies 34:2 (2000) pp 333–348'''

Notes

External links
 Interview at Channel 4

Year of birth missing (living people)
Living people
Historians of India
Historians of colonialism
British historians
Fellows of Keble College, Oxford